The longest uncrossed (or nonintersecting) knight's path is a mathematical problem involving a knight on the standard 8×8 chessboard or, more generally, on a square n×n board. The problem is to find the longest path the knight can take on the given board, such that the path does not intersect itself. A further distinction can be made between a closed path, which ends on the same field as where it begins, and an open path, which ends on a different field from where it begins.

Known solutions 
The longest open paths on an n×n board are known only for n ≤ 9. Their lengths for n = 1, 2, …, 9 are:
0, 0, 2, 5, 10, 17, 24, 35, 47 

The longest closed paths are known only for n ≤ 10. Their lengths for n = 1, 2, …, 10 are:
 0, 0, 0, 4, 8, 12, 24, 32, 42, 54

Generalizations 
The problem can be further generalized to rectangular n×m boards, or even to boards in the shape of any polyomino. The problem for n×m boards, where n doesn't exceed 8 and m might be very large was given at 2018 ICPC World Finals. The solution used dynamic programming and uses the fact that the solution should exhibit a cyclic behavior.

Other standard chess pieces than the knight are less interesting, but fairy chess pieces like the camel ((3,1)-leaper), giraffe ((4,1)-leaper) and zebra ((3,2)-leaper) lead to problems of comparable complexity.

See also
 A knight's tour is a self-intersecting knight's path visiting all fields of the board.
 TwixT, a board game based on uncrossed knight's paths.

References
 
 George Jelliss, Non-Intersecting Paths
 Non-crossing knight tours
 2018 ICPC World Finals solutions (Problem J)

External links 
 Uncrossed knight's tours

Mathematical chess problems
Computational problems in graph theory